Nonlabens arenilitoris is a Gram-negative, aerobic, non-spore-forming, rod-shaped and non-motile bacterium from the genus of Nonlabens which has been isolated from marine sand from the coast of South Korea.

References

Flavobacteria
Bacteria described in 2013